The Kandik River (Hän: K'ày' juu) is an  tributary of the Yukon River in Canada and the United States. Beginning in the Canadian territory of Yukon, it flows generally southwest into the U.S. state of Alaska. Continuing southwest, it enters the larger river slightly upstream of the mouth of the Charley River in Yukon–Charley Rivers National Preserve.

See also
List of rivers of Alaska
List of rivers of Yukon

References

Rivers of Yukon
Rivers of Alaska
Rivers of Southeast Fairbanks Census Area, Alaska
Tributaries of the Yukon River
Rivers of Unorganized Borough, Alaska